The 1904 SAFA Grand Final was an Australian rules football game contested between the Norwood Football Club and the Port Adelaide Football Club, held at the Jubilee Oval in Adelaide on 17 September 1904. It was the 9th annual Grand Final of the South Australian Football Association, staged to determine the premiers for the 1904 SAFA season. The match, attended by 15,000 spectators, was won by Norwood by a margin of 4 points, marking the clubs thirteenth premiership victory.

Jubilee Oval 
The 1904 SAFA Grand Final was the only instance of a South Australian state league grand final being held at Jubilee Oval. Jubilee Oval at the time was the host grounds of the Royal Adelaide Show.

Match Summary 
The 1904 Grand Final was a memorable one for Norwood who were down by 35 points at three-quarter time against traditional rival Port Adelaide. Norwood then produced an extraordinary burst of football with a goal by centre half forward Dean Dawson followed by two goals each from full forward, Bill Miller and half forward flanker, Stan Robinson. Norwood was only two points down with a minute remaining. Tommy Gibbons held a mark on a seemingly impossible angle. His kick sailed through the goal posts to give Norwood a four-point victory 9.8 to 8.10.

Teams

References 

SANFL Grand Finals
SAFA Grand Final, 1904